Samuil Jafimavič Płaŭnik (23 April 1886 – 3 November 1941), better known by the pen name Źmitrok Biadula, was a Soviet and Belarusian poet, prose writer, translator, and political activist in the Belarusian independence movement. He is considered one of the fathers of modern Belarusian literature.

Biography
He began writing Hebrew poems at age 13, based on medieval liturgical poetry. He later started writing in Russian and Belarusian, publishing works in the Saint Petersburg press and the Vilnius magazine Mołodyje Porywy. In 1910 he published poetic prose in Nasha Niva. Following the Soviet takeover of Belarus, he began writing novels in the Socialist realist genre.

After the German invasion of the USSR in 1941, Biadula fled Belarus. He lived first in Pizhma, Gorky Oblast, then, until the end of October 1941, in the village of Novye Burasy, Saratov Oblast. He died near Uralsk in Kazakhstan, where he was buried.

In February 2020, the remains of Źmitrok Biadula were exhumed and delivered to Belarus.

References

1886 births
1941 deaths
20th-century Belarusian poets
20th-century Belarusian writers
20th-century translators
People from Lahoysk District
People from Vilna Governorate
Recipients of the Order of the Red Banner of Labour
Soviet children's writers
Soviet male poets
Soviet translators
Belarusian Jews
Belarusian male poets
Belarusian male writers
Belarusian translators
Yiddish-language writers
Translators from Ukrainian
Translators from Yiddish
Translators to Belarusian
20th-century pseudonymous writers